The 2022–23 Persian Gulf Pro League (formerly known as Iran Pro League) is the 40th season of Iran's Football League and 22nd as Persian Gulf Pro League since its establishment in 2001. The 2022–23 season will start on 11 August 2022 and featured 14 teams from the 2021–22 Persian Gulf Pro League and two new teams promoted from the 2021–22 Azadegan League: Mes Kerman and Malavan.

Teams

Stadia and locations

Number of teams by region

Personnel and kits 
Note: Flags indicate national team as has been defined under FIFA eligibility rules. Players may hold more than one non-FIFA nationality.

Managerial changes

Foreign Players 

The number of foreign players is restricted to four per Persian Gulf Pro League team, including a slot for a player from AFC countries. A team can use four foreign players on the field in each game, including at least one player from the AFC country. 
In bold: Players that have been capped for their national team.

Notes

League table

Standings

Results

Positions by round 
The table lists the positions of teams after each week of matches. In order to preserve chronological evolvements, any postponed matches are not included to the round at which they were originally scheduled, but added to the full round they were played immediately afterwards.

Season statistics 

As of

Top scorers

Hat-tricks

Top assists

Clean sheets

Awards

Metrica Weekly awards

Attendances

Average home attendances

Attendances by round

Notes:Updated to games played on 20 February 2023. Source: Iranleague.ir  Matches with spectator bans are not included in average attendances

Highest attendances

Notes:Updated to games played on 20 February 2023. Source: Iranleague.ir

See also 
 2022–23 Azadegan League
 2022–23 2nd Division
 2022–23 3rd Division
 2022–23 Hazfi Cup
 2022 Iranian Super Cup
 2023–24 AFC Champions League

References 

Iran Pro League seasons
2022–23 in Iranian football
Iran
Current association football seasonsب